Mathematical Excursions: Side Trips along Paths Not Generally Traveled in Elementary Courses in Mathematics is a book on popular mathematics. It was written by Helen Abbot Merrill, published in 1933 by the Norwood Press, and reprinted (posthumously) by Dover Publications in 1957.

Topics
The book is devoted to mathematical puzzles and pastimes, gathered from Merrill's experience as a teacher. It has 15 chapters, most on arithmetic and number theory but with one on geometry.

Its topics include 

Audience and reception
The book is written for a general audience, and is intended to spark the interest of high school students in mathematics.
In general, only high school levels of algebra and geometry are needed to appreciate the book and solve its problems.
It could be used as individual reading, or in mathematics clubs,
and also for mathematics teachers looking for examples and demonstrations for their classes.

Of the original edition, reviewer David Eugene Smith wrote "the book ought to be in the hands of all teachers and on the shelves of all high schools and colleges". By the time of the 1957 reprint, reviewer Samuel L. Greitzer complained about its obsolete notation, as well as its uneven level of exposition and non-uniform inclusion of solutions to problems, and reviewer Roland Sprague noted that its treatment of perfect numbers was out of date. Nevertheless, Greitzer suggested that it would be appropriate as "enrichment" for high-school students.

References

External links
Mathematical Excursions in the Hathitrust Digital Library: Norwood Press edition, ; Dover edition, 

Popular mathematics books
1933 non-fiction books